This list of oldest businesses and companies in Australia includes businesses, whether incorporated or organised in a different form (such as a partnership). However, the list excludes non-commercial associations and educational, governmental, or religious organisations. The list only includes businesses that still operate today under either the same name or a variant (such as a contraction or a part) of the original name, since inception.

See also

 List of oldest companies
 List of oldest companies in the United States
 Companies by year of establishment

References

Oldest
Companies
History of companies of Australia
Oldest companies in Australia
Economy-related lists of superlatives
Oldest things